In enzymology, a calmodulin-lysine N-methyltransferase is an enzyme that catalyzes the chemical reaction

S-adenosyl-L-methionine + calmodulin L-lysine  S-adenosyl-L-homocysteine + calmodulin N6-methyl-L-lysine

Thus, the two substrates of this enzyme are S-adenosyl methionine and calmodulin L-lysine, whereas its two products are S-adenosylhomocysteine and calmodulin N6-methyl-L-lysine.

This enzyme belongs to the family of transferases, specifically those transferring one-carbon group methyltransferases.  The systematic name of this enzyme class is S-adenosyl-L-methionine:calmodulin-L-lysine N6-methyltransferase. Other names in common use include S-adenosylmethionine:calmodulin (lysine) N-methyltransferase, and S-adenosyl-L-methionine:calmodulin-L-lysine 6-N-methyltransferase.  This enzyme participates in lysine degradation.

References

 

EC 2.1.1
Enzymes of unknown structure